The Felix Chayes Prize is presented in alternate years for Excellence in Research in Mathematical Petrology by the International Association for Mathematical Geosciences (IAMG). The cash prize, named after American geologist and petrographer Felix Chayes, was established in 1997

Recipients

1997 Committee on Data Bases for Petrology 
1999 Hugh R. Rollinson 
2001 James Nicholls 
2003 Antonella Buccianti
2005 Eric Grunsky
2007 Hilmar von Eynatten  
2009 not awarded for this year   
2011 Istvan Dunkl    
2013 Raimon Tolosana-Delgado
2015 Yongzhang Zhou
2017 Clifford R. Stanley
2019 Peter Filzmoser

See also

 List of geology awards
 List of geophysics awards
 List of mathematics awards

References 

Awards of the International Association for Mathematical Geosciences
Awards established in 1997